Ján Svorada (born 28 August 1968 in Trenčín) is a retired Slovak and Czech road racing cyclist.
Svorada was born in Czechoslovakia; when that country split up in 1993, Svorada raced for Slovakia until 1996, when he started racing for the Czech Republic.

When Svorada won Stage 2 of the 1998 Tour de France he became a rarity in professional cycling because he at that point became a Tour de France stage winner who won at least one stage wth two different nationalities. His first stage win at the Tour de France (Stage 7 in 1994) was obtained as a Slovak cyclist, and later he won also a stage in 1998 as a Czech rider.

He competed for the Czech Republic at the 1996 Summer Olympics, the 2000 Summer Olympics, and the 2004 Summer Olympics.

Major results

1988
1st Stage 5 Olympia's Tour
1990
1st  Overall Peace Race
1st  Active rider classification
1st  Sprints classification
1st  Combination classification
1st Stages 1, 2 & 9b
1st Stage 2 GP Tell
1992
1st Stage 1 Tour de Romandie
2nd Overall GP du Midi-Libre
1st Stage 1
1993
1st  Intergiro classification Giro d'Italia
7th Overall KBC Driedaagse van De Panne-Koksijde
1994
1st  Overall GP du Midi-Libre
Giro d'Italia
1st Stages 9, 11 & 17
1st Stage 5a Vuelta a Andalucía
1st Stage 4 Tour de Romandie
1st Stage 7 Tour de France
1st Stage 5 Tour of Britain
1995
1st Stage 8 Tirreno–Adriatico
1st Stage 12 Giro d'Italia
1996
1st  Overall Étoile de Bessèges
1st Stages 4 & 5
1st  Road race, National Road Championships
1st Stage 1 Giro di Sardegna
1st Stage 2 Tour de Suisse
1st Grand Prix de Denain
2nd Grand Prix d'Ouverture La Marseillaise
4th Overall Tour Méditerranéen
1st Stage 1
4th Scheldeprijs
Tirreno–Adriatico
1st Stages 5a & 8
1997
Vuelta a España
1st Stages 11, 16 & 17
Volta a Catalunya
1st Stages 1a, 2 & 4
Tour of Galicia
1st Stages 1 & 3a
1st Stage 4 Giro di Sardegna 
1st Stage 3 Volta a Portugal
3rd Grand Prix d'Ouverture La Marseillaise
5th Paris–Tours
7th Overall Étoile de Bessèges
1st Stages 2, 3 & 5
7th CoreStates Classic
1998
1st  Road race, National Road Championships
1st Stage 3 Tirreno–Adriatico
1st Stage 4 4 Jours de Dunkerque
1st Stage 2 Tour de France
1st First Union Classic
1st Memorial Rik Van Steenbergen
3rd Giro della Provincia di Siracusa
Volta a Portugal
1st Stages 1 & 3
1999
1st Stage 3 Vuelta a Murcia
1st Stage 8 Tirreno–Adriatico
1st Clásica de Almería
2000
1st Stage 2 Tirreno–Adriatico
1st Stage 1a Giro del Trentino
1st Stage 3 Giro d'Italia
2nd Clásica de Almería
2001
1st Stage 3 4 Jours de Dunkerque
1st Stage 2 GP du Midi-Libre
1st Stage 20 Tour de France (Champs-Élysées)
1st Profronde van Pijnacker
3rd Overall Étoile de Bessèges
2002
Tour of Belgium
1st Stages 1 & 4 
1st Stage 1 Vuelta a Murcia
1st Wiener Radfest
1st Linz
6th Scheldeprijs
8th Milan–San Remo
2003
1st Stage 1 International Tour of Rhodes
1st Stage 1 Vuelta a Murcia
1st Stage 1 Settimana Internazionale Coppi e Bartali
3rd Overall Tour of Qatar
8th Milan–San Remo
2004
1st Stage 4 Giro del Trentino
1st Stage 1 Tour de Romandie
1st Rokycany
7th Grand Prix d'Ouverture La Marseillaise
2005
1st  Road race, National Road Championships
1st Stage 1 Bayern Rundfahrt
1st Stage 3 Rothaus Regio-Tour
3rd Stausee Rundfahrt
2006
5th Road race, National Road Championships
 6th GP Hydraulika Mikolasek

References

External links
 Official website
 Official Tour de France results for Ján Svorada
 
 
 
 
 
 

1968 births
Living people
Czech male cyclists
Czech Vuelta a España stage winners
Cyclists at the 1996 Summer Olympics
Cyclists at the 2000 Summer Olympics
Cyclists at the 2004 Summer Olympics
Czech Tour de France stage winners
Czech Giro d'Italia stage winners
Olympic cyclists of the Czech Republic
Tour de France Champs Elysées stage winners
Sportspeople from Trenčín
Tour de Suisse stage winners
Slovakian Tour de France stage winners
Slovak male cyclists